Tim Pendergast (born August 15, 1958) is an American football coach.  He served as the head football coach at Hamilton College in 2000 and at Cornell University from 2001 to 2003, compiling a career college football record of 9–28.

Head coaching record

References

Living people
UConn Huskies football coaches
Cornell Big Red football coaches
Hamilton Continentals football coaches
Ithaca Bombers football coaches
James Madison Dukes football coaches
Maine Black Bears football coaches
Memphis Tigers football coaches
Northwestern Wildcats football coaches
Ithaca College alumni
State University of New York at Cortland alumni
1958 births